Gilbert Van Tassel Hamilton (1877 – 1943) was an American physician and writer. He was the author of Introduction to Objective Psychopathology, one of the leading early manuals on psychopathology, and of A Research in Marriage, a pioneering report on sexual activity that was one of the references used by Havelock Ellis in writing Psychology of Sex.

Born in Frazeysburg, Ohio, in 1877, Hamilton was the son of an Ohio merchant. He received his university education at Ohio Wesleyan University, graduating with the AB in 1898. After completing his degree, he enrolled at Jefferson Medical College in Philadelphia, where he studied the treatment of nervous and mental disorders.

References
 Gilbert Van Tassel Hamilton and Introduction to Objective Psychopathology

1877 births
1943 deaths
American psychiatrists
People from Muskingum County, Ohio
Ohio Wesleyan University alumni